The 1991 Japan Series was the Nippon Professional Baseball (NPB) championship series for the 1991 season. It was the 42nd Japan Series and featured the Pacific League champion Seibu Lions against the Central League champion Hiroshima Toyo Carp. Seibu won their second consecutive PL pennant to reach the series, and Hiroshima finished first in the CL for the sixth time in franchise history. Played at Seibu Lions Stadium and Hiroshima Municipal Stadium, the Lions defeated the Carp four games to three in the best-of-seven series to win the franchise's 10th Japan Series title. Seibu slugger and regular season stolen-base champion Koji Akiyama was named Most Valuable Player of the series. The series was played between October 19 and October 28 with home field advantage going to the Pacific League.

Summary

Matchups

Game 1

Game 2

Game 3

Game 4

Game 5

Game 6

Game 7

See also
1991 World Series

References

External links
 Nippon Professional Baseball--Official website (in English)

Japan Series
Japan Series
Seibu Lions
Hiroshima Toyo Carp
Japan Series